West 21st Street Historic District is a national historic district located at Erie, Erie County, Pennsylvania.  It includes 35 contributing middle and upper class residential buildings built between 1857 and 1939.  They are in a variety of popular architectural styles including Queen Anne, Italianate, and Colonial Revival.  Many of the buildings have been converted to multi-family use.

It was added to the National Register of Historic Places in 1990.

References

Gallery

Houses on the National Register of Historic Places in Pennsylvania
Historic districts on the National Register of Historic Places in Pennsylvania
Colonial Revival architecture in Pennsylvania
Italianate architecture in Pennsylvania
Queen Anne architecture in Pennsylvania
Houses in Erie, Pennsylvania
National Register of Historic Places in Erie County, Pennsylvania